Phytoscutus bakeri is a species of mite in the family Phytoseiidae.

References

Phytoseiidae
Articles created by Qbugbot
Animals described in 1980